The School Days anime television series, based on the visual novel of the same name, was produced by TNK as a twelve-episode television series and two direct-to-video (OVA) releases. With the exception of the latter releases, the story, much like the game, follows the life of Makoto Itou, a first-year high school student who becomes the ambivalent love-interest of several girls during his second term, and the effects this has on himself and his relationships.

The premiere of the televised anime aired on July 3, 2007 on TV Kanagawa and finished up broadcast September 26 on AT-X.  Other stations that participated in the broadcast included Chiba TV, TV Aichi, TV Osaka and TV Saitama. On September 17, 2007, the day before the twelfth and final episode of the televised anime was to air on TV Kanagawa, a 16-year-old girl murdered her father, a 45-year-old police officer, in their  Kyoto home with an axe. TV Kanagawa promptly cancelled the Tuesday airing of the finale for its similarly violent content, as did every other station but AT-X who remained indecisive. In the week following though, AT-X announced that it had decided to air the finale on September 27 and October 1.

Eleven pieces of theme music are used for the episodes; two opening themes and nine ending themes. Four albums, "Innocent Blue", "School Days Ending Theme+", "School Days TV Original Sound Track" and "School Days VOCAL COMPLETE ALBUM" were published by Lantis. From September 26, 2007 to February 27, 2008, School Days was published into six limited and regular edition DVDs containing two episodes each. The first direct-to-video episode, "Valentine Days" was bundled with limited edition copies of School Days L×H. The second, "Magical Heart Kokoro-chan", was released on March 6, 2008.


Episodes

OVAs

References

School Days